Hillsdale High School may refer to:

 Hillsdale High School (San Mateo) — San Mateo, California
 Hillsdale High School (Michigan) — Hillsdale, Michigan
 Hillsdale High School (Ohio) — Jeromesville, Ohio
 Kremlin-Hillsdale High School — Kremlin, Oklahoma